Anatoly Arsenievich Kuzmin (November 18, 1859 — after 1912) was a zemstvo clerk (zemskiy nachalnik), a chairman of an uyezd congress and a deputy of the Third Imperial Duma from the Vologda Governorate between 1907 and 1912. In the Duma he was a member of the Right faction; he was also a member of the local self-government commission, the judiciary reform commission and the peasant commission.

Literature 
 Кузьмин Анатолий Арсеньевич (in Russian) // Государственная дума Российской империи: 1906—1917 / Б. Ю. Иванов, А. А. Комзолова, И. С. Ряховская. — Москва: РОССПЭН, 2008. — P. 307. — 735 p. — .
 Кузьмин (in Russian) // Члены Государственной Думы (портреты и биографии). Третий созыв. 1907—1912 гг. / Сост. М. М. Боиович. — Москва, 1913. — P. 36. — 526 p.

1859 births
Year of death missing
People from Vologda Governorate
Members of the 3rd State Duma of the Russian Empire